The Montana Standard is a Lee Enterprises daily newspaper and website in Butte, Montana.

In 1971, under the leadership of Betty Danfield, the paper's women's section won the Penney-Missouri Award for General Excellence.

References

External links
 
 
 Mini Nickel website
 ButteRats Community Forums

Newspapers published in Montana
Lee Enterprises publications
Mass media in Butte, Montana
1928 establishments in Montana
Publications established in 1928